The minister of public safety  is the minister of the Crown in the Canadian Cabinet responsible for overseeing Public Safety Canada, the internal security department of the Government of Canada. The portfolio succeeded the role of solicitor general of Canada in 2005.

The position was nominally created in December 2003 as a successor to the previous position of solicitor general, with the official title of Solicitor General carrying over during the 27th Canadian Ministry. It incorporated the responsibilities associated with the solicitor general, including responsibility for the Correctional Service of Canada, the Royal Canadian Mounted Police, the Parole Board of Canada, and the Canadian Security Intelligence Service. The portfolio also assumed responsibility for the Canada Border Services Agency upon that agency's formation in December 2003. The title of Solicitor General was abolished in 2005 and formally replaced in relevant laws with the present title.

The minister is also responsible for the Emergency Management Act.

List of ministers
Key:

See also

 Minister of Justice and Attorney General of Canada

References

External links 
 Public Safety Canada

Public Safety
Federal departments and agencies of Canada
Emergency services in Canada
Emergency management in Canada
Solicitors general